Bohemannia quadrimaculella is a moth of the family Nepticulidae. It is found from Norway and Sweden, south to France and from Ireland, east to the Czech Republic and Austria. It has also been recorded from Romania.

The wingspan is 7,4-8,8 mm. 7–9 mm. The head is orange and the collar ochreous-whitish. Antennal eyecaps are ochreous-whitish. Forewings bright shining purplish-copper ; yellow -whitish costal and dorsal opposite spots beyond middle. Hindwings dark fuscous. Adults are on wing from July to August in one generation.

The larvae possibly feed on alder (Alnus glutinosa) mining the buds or twig bark.

Reference

 Meyrick, E., 1895 A Handbook of British Lepidoptera MacMillan, London pdf  Keys and description

External links
The Moths of Suffolk
Swedish Moths
Bohemannia quadrimaculella at UKMoths
Lepiforum

Nepticulidae
Leaf miners
Moths described in 1851
Moths of Europe
Taxa named by Carl Henrik Boheman